Spotted Hemlock is a 1958 mystery detective novel by the British writer Gladys Mitchell. It is the thirty first in the long-running series of books featuring Mitchell's best known creation, the psychoanalyst and amateur detective Mrs Bradley. It has been considered one of Mitchell's best novels along with other works such as The Saltmarsh Murders, Death at the Opera and The Rising of the Moon.

Synopsis
The students of Calladale a female agricultural college have been ragged by a local men's college, and are plotting their revenge when the body of one of their students is found hidden away in a local pub. Dame Beatrice Bradley is called in by her nephew, one of the teachers at Calladale, to investigate.

References

Bibliography
 Hanson, Gillian Mary. City and Shore: The Function of Setting in the British Mystery. McFarland, 2015.
 Magill, Frank Northen. Critical Survey of Mystery and Detective Fiction: Authors, Volume 3. Salem Press, 1988.
 Reilly, John M. Twentieth Century Crime & Mystery Writers. Springer, 2015.

1958 British novels
Novels by Gladys Mitchell
British crime novels
British mystery novels
British thriller novels
Novels set in England
British detective novels
Michael Joseph books